Quasimitra cardinalis is a species of sea snail, a marine gastropod mollusk in the family Mitridae, the miters or miter snails.

Description

Distribution
Can be found in Japan, the Mascarene Basin, Madagascar, and Mauritius.

References

cardinalis
Gastropods described in 1791